Damias pelochroa is a moth of the family Erebidae first described by George Hampson in 1914. It is found in Australia.

References

Damias
Moths described in 1914